Okan Aydın (born 8 May 1994) is a professional footballer who plays as a forward for Hungarian club Debrecen. Born in Germany, he is a former youth international for Turkey.

Club career
Aydın went through Bayer 04 Leverkusen's youth ranks and eventually made his Bundesliga debut in October 2012 in a 2–2 draw with Mainz 05, as a substitute for Simon Rolfes. On 6 September 2013, he joined Eskişehirspor on a three-year contract. After not being able to establish himself at the Turkish club and earning only a single cap during the 2013–14 season, he moved back to Germany and joined 3. Liga side Rot-Weiß Erfurt. There he signed a one-year contract including a two-year extension clause.

In September 2020, Okan moved to China League One side Jiangxi Liansheng F.C. from Austria Klagenfurt.

On 14 January 2022, Okan signed a 1.5-year contract with TSV Hartberg in the Austrian Football Bundesliga.

On 14 February 2023, Okan joined Debrecen in Hungary.

International career
Aydın played for the Turkey national under-19 football team, which won the silver medal at the 2013 Mediterranean Games in Mersin, Turkey. He also represented Turkey at the 2013 UEFA European Under-19 Championship. Aydin also represented Germany at the 2011 U17 World Cup where he helped Germany obtain third place after losing a dramatic overtime game in the semifinals to the eventual champions and hosts Mexico.

Personal life
Aydın's younger brother, Anıl Aydın, is also a professional footballer.

References

External links
 Turkish Football Federation profile
 
 
 
 

1994 births
Sportspeople from Leverkusen
Footballers from North Rhine-Westphalia
German people of Turkish descent
Living people
Association football forwards
German footballers
Germany youth international footballers
Turkish footballers
Turkey youth international footballers
Bayer 04 Leverkusen II players
Bayer 04 Leverkusen players
Eskişehirspor footballers
FC Rot-Weiß Erfurt players
Chemnitzer FC players
FC Viktoria 1889 Berlin players
SK Austria Klagenfurt players
Jiangxi Beidamen F.C. players
FC Wacker Innsbruck (2002) players
TSV Hartberg players
Debreceni VSC players
Bundesliga players
Regionalliga players
Süper Lig players
3. Liga players
2. Liga (Austria) players
China League One players
Austrian Football Bundesliga players
Nemzeti Bajnokság I players
Mediterranean Games silver medalists for Turkey
Mediterranean Games medalists in football
Competitors at the 2013 Mediterranean Games
Turkish expatriate footballers
German expatriate footballers
Expatriate footballers in Austria
Turkish expatriate sportspeople in Austria
German expatriate sportspeople in Austria
Expatriate footballers in China
Turkish expatriate sportspeople in China
German expatriate sportspeople in China
Expatriate footballers in Hungary
Turkish expatriate sportspeople in Hungary
German expatriate sportspeople in Hungary